Mullakayevo (Mullaqay) is a rural locality (a village) in Arkh-Latyshsky Selsoviet, Arkhangelsky District, Bashkortostan, Russia. The population was 201 as of 2010. There are 4 streets.

Geography 
Mullakayevo is located 8 km southeast of Arkhangelskoye (the district's administrative centre) by road. Beysovo is the nearest rural locality.

References 

Rural localities in Arkhangelsky District